Lt.-Colonel The Hon. Arthur Trefusis Heneage Williams (June 13, 1837 – July 4, 1885) was a Canadian businessman, farmer and political figure. His statue stands in front of the town hall of Port Hope, Ontario.

Biography 

Born at Penryn Park, Port Hope in Upper Canada in 1837, a member of the Williams family of Caerhays and Burncoose. He was the eldest son of John Tucker Williams and his wife Sarah, daughter of Judge Thomas Ward (1770–1861) of Port Hope. He studied at Upper Canada College and the University of Edinburgh before travelling throughout Europe. He studied law but was not called to the bar, instead he 'delighted in calling himself a farmer', managing Penryn Park, the estate he'd inherited from his father. He was president and founder of the Midlands Loan and Savings Company and a director for the Midland Railway of Canada.

In politics, he represented Durham East in the Legislative Assembly of Ontario from 1867 to 1874 and in the House of Commons of Canada as a Conservative member from 1879 to 1885.

Williams was captain in the local militia, later becoming lieutenant-colonel. In 1885, he led The Midland Battalion which helped put down the North-West Rebellion. Shortly after the Battle of Batoche, he became ill and died of fever on a steamboat on the North Saskatchewan River in 1885. The Dictionary of Canadian Biography writes,

Colonel Williams was the only nationally known figure to die in the northwest campaign and his body was brought home in state. A huge funeral was held in Port Hope where citizens erected a statue in his honour. Parliament voted his orphaned children a special pension. Then, like most heroes, he was gradually forgotten. To Charles Arkoll Boulton, a contemporary, Williams "represented what might be termed Young Canada"; to posterity, he reflects a model of the patriotic landed gentleman, using his wealth and position for dignified public service, accepting payment in the currency of honour and prestige. In short, Arthur Williams was an anachronism.

Williams married Emily, the daughter of Senator Benjamin Seymour of Port Hope. They were the parents of  General Arthur Victor Seymour Williams.

A collection of his North-West Rebellion Medal with Saskatchewan bar and his son's Second Boer War, and World War I medals were auctioned by Plato Auctions in April 2010.

References

External links
 
 
 
 Williams Family, Port Hope Archives

1837 births
1885 deaths
Canadian Militia officers
Progressive Conservative Party of Ontario MPPs
Conservative Party of Canada (1867–1942) MPs
Members of the House of Commons of Canada from Ontario
Canadian people of English descent
People from Northumberland County, Ontario
Alumni of the University of Edinburgh
19th-century Canadian businesspeople
Canadian farmers
Upper Canada College alumni
North-West Rebellion
Canadian militia officers
Canadian military personnel from Ontario